André Filipe Lopes Costa (born 27 November 1992 in Barcelos) is a Portuguese footballer who plays for Rio Ave F.C. as a defender.

External links

1992 births
Living people
Portuguese footballers
Association football defenders
Primeira Liga players
Rio Ave F.C. players
People from Barcelos, Portugal
Sportspeople from Braga District
21st-century Portuguese people